The 1928 World Table Tennis Championships women's singles was the second edition of the women's singles championship.
Mária Mednyánszky defeated Erika Metzger in the final of this event, 21–19, 22–20, 21–13.

Draw

Finals

See also
 List of World Table Tennis Championships medalists

References

-
World